The Royal Palace of the Kingdom of Tonga is located in the northwest of the capital, Nukualofa, close to the Pacific Ocean. The wooden Palace, which was built in 1867, is the official residence of the King of Tonga. The palace is not open to the public, and it is easily visible from the waterfront.

Overview

In line with the deference the Tongans have for the Royal Family, poets almost never refer to the palace (pālasi) by name, but use heliaki  or allegoric references like: Fanga-tapu ("sacred beach", the stretch of shoreline fronting the building), Loto-ā ("inside the fence"), Ā-maka ("stone fence"), Hangai Tokelau ("north wind against", the name of a tree near the kitchen), and so forth.

The old, metre-high stone fence was so sacred to the king that none would dare sit on it, let alone cross it. However, after 1990, King Tāufaʻāhau Tupou IV had a 3-metre high grid fence erected. After 2000, some people broke through the gates with trucks, prompting the installation of iron bars to secure the gates.

Other royal residences 
The King and royal family have several more palaces to choose from. There is a palace in Fuaamotu, as well as  Kauvai near Longoteme, Liukava ("revolution") in Kolovai, and both Tufumāhina and Vila (villa) between Koloua and Pea. 

Vila was built by Crown Prince Tupoutoa in the 1990s, who lived there upon his accession as King George Tupou V, far away from any neighbours. Since his death, that palace remained largely unused, but in 2010 major renovations were conducted. A new fence was erected and new wings added to house the Tongan National Archives on one side, and offices of the Privy Council of Tonga on the other side. It is expected that the king will also hold royal audiences there again, instead of the now-deserted residence of the former British High Commissioner.

There is Tauakipulu palace on Lifuka in Haapai, Fangatongo ("mangrove beach") near Talau on Vavau, and there are residences in Niuafoou and Niuatoputapu. The palace of Eua is just north of the harbour in Taanga. In the 1980s, Taufa'ahau Tupou IV had a new palace built on a mountaintop near Houma, but it was unused and by around 1990 only the artistically made bathtub remained, overgrown by weeds and disappearing sometime around 2000.

Significant events 
In February 2017, a vigil marked by choral singing and small fires was held at the perimeter of the Royal Palace on the eve of the funeral of queen mother Halaevalu Mataʻaho ʻAhomeʻe, who died on 19 February.

References

External links

Tongan monarchs
Palaces in Tonga
Buildings and structures in Nukuʻalofa
Royal residences in Tonga
Houses completed in 1867
Victorian architecture